Diede de Groot and Aniek van Koot defeated the defending champions Marjolein Buis and Yui Kamiji in the final, 6–1, 6–3 to win the women's doubles wheelchair tennis title at the 2018 French Open.

Seeds

Draw

Finals

References
 Draw

Wheelchair Women's Doubles
French Open, 2018 Women's Doubles